Irene Awino Otieno (born March 26, 1986) is a Kenyan rugby sevens player. She represented the Kenya's women's sevens team at the 2016 Summer Olympics. She was in Kenya's squad that played at the 2016 France Women's Sevens.

References

External links 
 
 Player Profile

1986 births
Living people
Female rugby sevens players
Rugby sevens players at the 2016 Summer Olympics
Olympic rugby sevens players of Kenya
Kenya international rugby sevens players
Kenya international women's rugby sevens players